The Wigan Warriors Women are an English professional women's rugby league team based in Wigan, Greater Manchester.  They were formed in 2018 and played during the second season of the Women's Super League in 2018 and won the title beating Leeds Rhinos Women in 18–16 in the Grand Final at the Manchester Regional Arena.

Players

Wigan Warriors Women

Seasons

Honours

Leagues
Women's Super League
Grand Final
Winners (1): 2018
League Leader's Shield
Runners-up (1): 2018

References

Wigan Warriors
2018 establishments in England
Rugby clubs established in 2018
Sport in Wigan
Women's rugby league teams in England
Rugby league teams in Greater Manchester
RFL Women's Super League
English rugby league teams